Thomas H. "Chip" Gannon (February 11, 1922 – October 19, 1997) was an American football player and coach. He was a halfback and defensive back at Harvard University, lettering from 1946 to 1948.
Gannon served as the head football coach at American International University from 1949 to 1951. He was selected by the Los Angeles Dons of the All-America Football Conference in the 1949 AAFC Draft.

References

1922 births
1997 deaths
American football halfbacks
American football defensive backs
Harvard Crimson football players
American International Yellow Jackets football coaches